, also known by his Chinese style name , was a bureaucrat of the Ryukyu Kingdom.

He was the eldest son of Okuma Chōjū, and was also a grandson of Urasoe Chōshi. Tajima was appointed as the first , the magistrate of this bureau. He compiled the earliest and most voluminous regional gazetteer, Ryūkyū-koku yurai-ki, and dedicated it to King Shō Kei in 1713.

Tajima served as a member of Sanshikan from 1710 to 1716.

References

1655 births
1737 deaths
Ueekata
Sanshikan
People of the Ryukyu Kingdom
Ryukyuan people
17th-century Ryukyuan people
18th-century Ryukyuan people